Dosiran (also Romanized as Doosīrān; also known as Do Sarān, 'and'Doserū', and Dow Sarān) is a village in Kuhmareh Rural District, Kuhmareh District, Kazerun County, Fars Province, Iran. At the 2006 census, its population was 2,424, in 591 families.

References 

Populated places in Kazerun County